The Battle of Zapote Bridge was fought on February 17, 1897, as part of the Philippine Revolution. Filipino revolutionary forces led by General Emilio Aguinaldo defeated Spanish forces under the command of Governor-General Camilo de Polavieja. In this battle, General Edilberto Evangelista (a Filipino civil engineer, trench builder and member of the Katipunan) was killed.

Background
With the loss of the revolutionary battle and the opening of the second phase of the war, the Spaniards began their campaign to recapture territories. This campaign was in Filipino hands in the early phase of the revolution after the decisive battles of Binakayan and Dalahican in 1896. Governor-General Camilo de Polavieja now fully aware that the mainweight of the revolution is in Cavite, decided to launch a two-pronged assault which will defeat the revolutionaries led by Aguinaldo. He ordered  General José de Lachambre with a much bigger force to march against Silang to take on the Katipuneros from the rear, while he himself will engaged the Filipinos head on- known as "Cavite Offensive". More than 20,000 Spaniards marched from Manila towards Cavite province to reclaim the provincial towns lost to the revolutionaries. The revolutionaries then planned a counterattack to stop the Spanish offensive in Cavite. The site of the battle was planned for Zapote Bridge in Bacoor.

Battle
Hiding his army of 10,000 regulars and irregulars in the bushes of the Zapote River's southern bank, armed only with spears, bolo knives and improvised firearms, Aguinaldo ordered soldiers to plant dynamite along the bridge and place pointed bamboo sticks in the river beds below the bridge. Several hours later, 16,000 Spaniards began to cross the bridge. The trap was sprung and the dynamite was detonated, killing several Spanish troops and injuring many more. The rebels then emerged from the bushes and fought hand-to-hand, repelling consecutive waves of enemy troops charging across the river. During this fight Evangelista was shot in the head and died.

After the battle, the demoralized Spanish soldiers retreated towards Muntinlupa. The Filipino side suffered 450 casualties with more than 900 wounded. The Spanish side suffered 441 casualties and approximately 870 wounded. In addition, 313 Spanish soldiers were captured.

Aftermath
Aguinaldo and his troops resumed the liberation of captured Cavite towns little by little, following battles at Binakayan and Dalahican. Two days later, however, the Filipino offensive was halted when news reached Aguinaldo that the Spanish had resumed their offensive after storming the rebel stronghold in Silang, Cavite. As the Spanish forces were marching toward Imus, the seat of Aguinaldo's faction, Aguinaldo redirected his troops to Perez, Dasmariñas, where the Battle of Perez Dasmariñas had begun.

See also
Battle of Binakayan-Dalahican
Battle of Perez Dasmariñas
Katipunan
Emilio Aguinaldo
Edilberto Evangelista
Tomas Mascardo
José de Lachambre

References

 
 

Zapote Bridge 1897
1897 in the Philippines
Zapote Bridge
History of Cavite
History of Metro Manila
February 1897 events